The Batı Kozluca oil field is an oil field located in Batman, Batman Province, Southeastern Anatolia Region. It was discovered in 1978 and developed by Türkiye Petrolleri Anonim Ortaklığı. It began production in 1980 and  produces oil.

References

Oil fields in Turkey
Buildings and structures in Batman Province
Geography of Batman Province